Lignon may refer to:

Lignon, Marne, a commune in northern France
Lignon du Forez, a river in south-central France, left tributary of the Loire
Lignon du Velay, a river in south-central France, right tributary of the Loire
Lignon (Ardèche), a river in south-central France, right tributary of the Ardèche
Le Lignon, a community in Vernier, Switzerland in the Geneva metropolitan area